Khiaran or Kheyaran may refer to:

Khiaran, Kermanshah
Khiaran, Lorestan